Henry Pennington was an English professional footballer who played as a goalkeeper in the Football League for Notts County.

Honours 
Brentford
 London Senior Cup: 1897–98

Career statistics

References

1873 births
Date of death missing
People from Farnworth
English footballers
1st Scots Guards F.C. players
English Football League players
Southern Football League players
Association football goalkeepers
Chorley F.C. players
Notts County F.C. players
Brentford F.C. players
Atherton F.C. players
Denaby United F.C. players